Wantage is a constituency in Oxfordshire represented in the House of Commons of the Parliament of the United Kingdom by Conservative MP David Johnston.

Johnston was first elected at the 2019 general election replacing Ed Vaizey who served as MP for Wantage for 14 years after first being elected at the 2005 general election.

History
The constituency was created for the 1983 general election further to the Third Periodic Review of Westminster Constituencies.  This followed on from the reorganisation of local government under the Local Government Act 1972 which came in to force in April 1974.  This saw the bulk of the area represented by the constituency of Abingdon in Berkshire being transferred to Oxfordshire.  Under the Review, the majority of the Abingdon constituency formed the new constituency of Wantage, with the town of Abingdon-on-Thames and areas to the west of Oxford being included in the new constituency of Oxford West and Abingdon.

The first MP for Wantage was Robert Jackson, who served as a junior minister under both Margaret Thatcher and John Major. Jackson defected to the Labour Party in 2005 shortly before standing down as an MP for the 2005 general election. At that election, Ed Vaizey was elected as MP for Wantage and 2010-2016 held the post of Minister for Culture, Communications and Creative Industries.

Ed Vaizey served as MP for Wantage until the 2019 general election whereby Vaizey announced that he would be standing down. Shortly prior to this, Vaizey had the Conservative whip removed after voting against Prime Minister Boris Johnson on 3 September 2019. Vaizey had the Conservative whip restored on 29 October 2019. This meant that, for a brief time, Wantage was represented by an independent MP. David Johnston was selected as the Conservative candidate to represent Wantage and was duly elected as the new MP for Wantage at the 2019 general election.

The seat, including its forerunner, has been won by Conservative Party candidates since 1924. The 2015 result made the seat the 76th-safest of the Conservative Party's 331 seats by percentage of majority.

All five parties' candidates achieved more than the deposit-retaining threshold of 5% of the vote in 2015. Social Democrat candidate Winifred Tumin won the largest third-party share of the vote to date, in the 1983 election — 32.3% of the vote.

Constituency profile 
The Wantage constituency covers the south-western part of Oxfordshire. There are three market towns in the constituency: Faringdon, Wallingford and Wantage. All have tourist attractions, Wantage having monuments to being the birthplace of King Alfred the Great, Wallingford, ancient enclosure walls of a castle and a medieval bridge. Faringdon bears a scar of the English Civil War as its church lost its steeple.  The largest town in the constituency is Didcot, which grew up around the Great Western Railway when Isambard Kingdom Brunel built a branch line from its main line between London and Bristol to Oxford, siting the junction at the then-sparsely-populated parish and it has a power station and many major national construction and aggregate industries.

The constituency is mostly rural in character, with more than 400 farms in operation. Included are the Uffington White Horse and The Ridgeway, a prehistoric road, runs along its southern border. The River Thames runs along the northern and western border. The area is affluent and Conservative in nature containing many commuters with fast transport links to London, with Didcot the only area with a strong Labour vote locally. The seat includes international race horse breeders and trainers with racing stables across a broad area that reaches into the Lambourn Downs, crossing over the southern border into the Newbury constituency in Berkshire.

Workless claimants, registered jobseekers, were in November 2012 significantly lower than the national average of 3.8%, at 1.6% of the population based on a statistical compilation by The Guardian.

Boundaries and boundary changes 

1983–2010: The District of Vale of White Horse wards of Appleton, Craven, Drayton, Faringdon and Littleworth, Greendown, Grove, Harwell and Chilton, Hendred, Icknield, Island Villages, Kingston Bagpuize and Southmoor, Longworth, Marcham, Segsbury, Shrivenham, Stanford, Steventon, Sutton Courtenay, The Coxwells, and Upton and Blewbury, and the District of South Oxfordshire wards of Brightwell, Cholsey, Didcot North, Didcot Northbourne, Didcot South, Hagbourne, and Wallingford.

The new constituency included Wantage, Wallingford, Faringdon and Didcot which had previously all been part of the abolished constituency of Abingdon.

2010–present: The District of Vale of White Horse wards of Blewbury and Upton, Craven, Drayton, Faringdon and The Coxwells, Greendown, Grove, Hanneys, Harwell, Hendreds, Kingston Bagpuize with Southmoor, Longworth, Marcham and Shippon, Shrivenham, Stanford, Sutton Courtenay and Appleford, Wantage Charlton, and Wantage Segsbury, and the District of South Oxfordshire wards of Brightwell, Cholsey and Wallingford South, Didcot All Saints, Didcot Ladygrove, Didcot Northbourne, Didcot Park, Hagbourne, and Wallingford North.

Marginal changes due to the realignment of the boundaries following changes to local authority wards.

In 2021 the Boundary Commission for England proposed boundary changes to the Wantage constituency in order to reduce the number of electorate in the constituency. At the time of the 2019 General Election, Wantage's total electorate was 90,845, making it the largest constituency in Oxfordshire and the 13th largest in the United Kingdom. The proposals would see the total electorate reduced to 71,460 which is significantly closer to the average electorate of 72,200 for constituencies in England.

The commission proposed the renaming of the Wantage constituency to 'Didcot and Wantage'. The proposed boundary changes would see the wards of Faringdon, Kingston Bagpuize, Stanford in the Vale, Watchfield and Shrivenham move into the Witney constituency, whilst the newly renamed Didcot and Wantage constituency would absorb the wards of Clifton Hampden, Culham, Nuneham Courtenay and Sandford-on-Thames from the Henley constituency.

Members of Parliament

Elections

Elections in the 2010s

Elections in the 2000s

Elections in the 1990s

Elections in the 1980s

Neighbouring constituencies

See also
 List of parliamentary constituencies in Oxfordshire
 Banbury (UK Parliament constituency)
 Henley (UK Parliament constituency)
 Oxford East (UK Parliament constituency)
 Oxford West and Abingdon (UK Parliament constituency)
 Witney (UK Parliament constituency)

Notes

References

Parliamentary constituencies in Oxfordshire
Constituencies of the Parliament of the United Kingdom established in 1983
Wantage